Martland is an unincorporated community in Fillmore County, Nebraska, United States. It lies at an elevation of 1640 feet (500 m).

History
Martland got its start following construction of the railroad through the territory. A post office was established at Martland in 1889, and remained in operation until it was discontinued in 1949.

References

Unincorporated communities in Fillmore County, Nebraska
Unincorporated communities in Nebraska